Neil Bamford (born 10 February 1982) is a British former professional tennis player.

Biography
Bamford, a right-handed player from Hertfordshire, made three main draw appearance at Wimbledon. In 2006 and 2007 he featured in the main draw partnering Jim May, the first of those appearances coming as successful qualifiers. At the 2008 Wimbledon Championships he was granted a wildcard for a second time and played with Josh Goodall. He and Goodall were losing finalists at the Mexico City Challenger in 2008.

Retiring after the 2008 season, he now works as a tennis coach at Dukes Meadows in London.

References

External links
 
 

1982 births
Living people
British male tennis players
Tennis people from Hertfordshire
English male tennis players